Dufrenoyia is an extinct genus of Cretaceous ammonites included in the family Parahoplitidae. These fast-moving nektonic carnivores lived in the Cretaceous period (Aptian age). The type species of the genus is Ammonites dufrenoyi.

Species

 Dufrenoyia codazziana Karsten, 1886
 Dufrenoyia dufrenoyi d'Orbigny, 1840
 Dufrenoyia furcata Sowerby, 1836
 Dufrenoyia justinae Hill, 1893

Distribution
Fossils of species within this genus have been found in the Cretaceous sediments of Germany, Mexico, Morocco, Spain, the United Kingdom, United States, Colombia and Venezuela.

References

 Arkell et al., 1957. Mesozoic Ammonoidea. Treatise on Invertebrate Paleontology, Part L Ammonoidea. Geological Soc of America and University of Kansas press.

Ammonitida genera
Ancyloceratina
Cretaceous ammonites
Early Cretaceous ammonites of North America